

Date
In Brazil, dates follow the "day month year" order, using a slash as the separator. Leading zeros may be omitted, specifically on the month, but never on the year field: . In formal writing, months are spelled out and not capitalized, e.g., "" (lit. 20 of June of 2008 / English: 20th of June 2008). Besides, day (except the first) and year numbers are read as ordinals and year numbers are not grouped as in English. So, for instance, Brazilians never say "" ("nineteen eighteen") for 1918, but they spell it as "" ("one thousand, nine hundred and eighteen"). Below are some examples of dates and various formats of writing and reading them.

Read as:  (first of May of one thousand, nine hundred and twenty-seven).
Or informally as: . (one of May of twenty-seven).

Note: If the century in question is specified in the context (this is particularly true for years of the twentieth century) only the final part may be read. For example, the above date might be very shortly spelled as "" (one of the five of twenty-seven).

Read as:  (two of December of one thousand, nine hundred and sixty-seven).
Or informally as:  (two of the twelve of one thousand, nine hundred and sixty-seven).

Within a month, days are referred to as ""+"ordinal number that corresponds to the date". Let us suppose a test is set up for April 15 and hearers know what the month in question is. In situations like this, the speaker usually says "" ("The test will be on the day fifteen"). Again, if we suppose the month in question is April, then ""="(the) day fifteen of last month" means March 15 and ""="(the) day fifteen of next month" is used for May 15.

Time
In formal writing full hours can be written just with an "", e.g.,  (not ).

Time in Brazil
Brazil